The gens Vetilia, also written Vecilia, was a minor plebeian family at Rome.  Members of this gens never attained much importance in the Roman state.

Origin
The Vetilii were probably of Etruscan origin, their nomen being Latinised from the Etruscan Vetlnei.

Members
 Gaius Vetilius, praetor in 147 BC, was sent to Spain, where after initial successes against the Lusitanians, he was defeated by Viriathus near Tribola, and slain.
 Vetilius, a leno, or pandar, to whom a certain Juventius left a legacy.  The praetor Quintus Metellus refused Vetilius' claim for the property on account of his unsavoury occupation.
 Publius Vetilius, described by Cicero as a relative of Sextus Aebutius, was one of the witnesses in the trial of Aulus Caecina Severus.

See also
 List of Roman gentes

References

Bibliography
 Marcus Tullius Cicero, Pro Caecina.
 Valerius Maximus, Factorum ac Dictorum Memorabilium (Memorable Facts and Sayings).
 Appianus Alexandrinus (Appian), Hispanica (The Spanish Wars).
 Dictionary of Greek and Roman Biography and Mythology, William Smith, ed., Little, Brown and Company, Boston (1849).
 August Pauly, Georg Wissowa, et alii, Realencyclopädie der Classischen Altertumswissenschaft (Scientific Encyclopedia of the Knowledge of Classical Antiquities, abbreviated RE or PW), J. B. Metzler, Stuttgart (1894–1980).

Roman gentes